Port Royal is a toponym for a rural intersection on the north bank of the Annapolis Basin about  from the town of Annapolis Royal in Annapolis County, Nova Scotia, Canada. It has no legal status in local government. It is the site of the Port-Royal National Historic Site, a replica of an Acadian settlement that existed from 1605 until its destruction by the English in 1613.

References

Communities in Annapolis County, Nova Scotia
Populated places established in 1605
1605 establishments in New France
Military forts in Acadia
Military forts in Nova Scotia